Roger Valentin Iribarne Contreras (born 2 January 1996) is a Cuban athlete specialising in the high hurdles. He represented his country at the 2017 World Championships reaching the semifinals. In addition, he won the silver medal at the 2015 Pan American Junior Championships.

His personal best in the 110 metres hurdles is 13.39 seconds (-0.1 m/s) set in Havana in 2017.

International competitions

1Disqualified in the final

References

1996 births
Living people
Cuban male hurdlers
World Athletics Championships athletes for Cuba
Central American and Caribbean Games bronze medalists for Cuba
Competitors at the 2018 Central American and Caribbean Games
Athletes (track and field) at the 2019 Pan American Games
Pan American Games competitors for Cuba
Central American and Caribbean Games medalists in athletics
21st-century Cuban people